Shahrak-e Mohandesi-ye Zerai (also Romanized as Shahrak-e Mohandesī-ye Zerā‘ī) is a village in Mohammadabad Rural District, in the Central District of Karaj County, Alborz Province, Iran. At the 2006 census, its population was 4,276, in 1,181 families.

References 

Populated places in Karaj County